The Police Department of the MVD () was the main police force of the Russian Empire and part of the Ministry of Police in the late 19th century, and was responsible for the management of all the police forces in the Russian Empire including Okhrana branches, and was aided by the Special Corps of Gendarmes.

History
 
The Police Department was established on August 6, 1880 following the dissolution of the Third Section. The newly formed Police department was part of the MVD. From 1880 til 1883 it was called The Department of the State Police ("Департамент государственной полиции"). Under its jurisdiction was the Okhrana, all the policing bodies, including the detective branches, and the Fire departments.

After the February Revolution the Department was dissolved by the decree of the Russian provisional government from February 27, 1917. 

After the October Revolution the government has announced the establishment of the Militsiya, as the new police force.

Director
The head of the department was The Director of the Police Department, which was appointed by the Minister of the Internal Affairs.

See also
 Ministry of Police of Imperial Russia
Okhrana

Further reading
 Ronald Hingley, The Russian Secret Police: Muscovite, Imperial, and Soviet Political Security Operations (Simon & Schuster, New York, 1970). 
 R. J. Stove, The Unsleeping Eye: Secret Police and Their Victims (Encounter Books, San Francisco, 2003). 
 Dominic Lieven (ed.), The Cambridge History of Russia, Volume II: Imperial Russia, 1689–1917,  Cambridge University Press (2006), .

References

Russian Empire
Law enforcement in Russia
National security institutions
1880 in the Russian Empire
Branches of the secret services of the Russian Empire
Government agencies established in 1880
Organizations disestablished in 1917
1880 establishments in the Russian Empire
1917 disestablishments in Russia